Nepali Cinema, also referred to as "Nepali Chalachitra" in Nepali, is the filmmaking industry in Nepal. This includes films in various languages of Nepal, most notably in Nepali, Maithili and Bhojpuri. The term Kollywood is also used, as a portmanteau for films produced in the Nepali language while the Nepalese films produced from Kathmandu and Janakpur in the Maithili language is known as Mithilawood. Both of these film industries are the largest viewing cinema of Nepal and are collectively known as Kollywood.

History
The making of Nepalese films is said to have begun with D.B. Pariyar's Satya Harishchandra, which was the first Nepali-language movie to be shot. It was produced from Kolkata, India and was released on 14 September 1951. Aama (mother) was the first film produced in Nepal and was released on 7 October 1964. It was produced by the Information Department of His Majesty's Government of Nepal (now Government of Nepal (GoN)). It was directed by Hira Singh Khatri and written by Durga Shrestha and Chaitya Devi. the lead actors were Shiva Shankar Manandhar , Bhuwan Chand, Chaitya Devi and Basundhara Bhusal who are regarded as the first actors in the Nepali film industry.

The first film to be produced under a private banner was Maitighar, which was released at the end of 1966 by Sumonanjali Films Pvt. Ltd. Although it was a Nepalese movie, it had many Indians contributing toward its making. Mala Sinha played the lead role, along with Chidambar Prasad Lohani, whom she later married. It had special appearances of Sunil Dutt and comedian Rajendra Nath. Directed by B.S. Thapa and music scored by Jaidev, a veteran maestro, it had Lata Mangeshkar, Asha Bhosle, Usha Mangeshkar and Manna Dey, all of whom were established Indian singers, doing the playback singing with Prem Dhoj Pradhan, C.P. Lohani and Aruna Lama.

The Nepal government established the Royal Nepal Film Corporation in 1971. Mann Ko Bandh was the first film produced by the corporation; Jay Rana was the director. Nati Kaji and Shiva Shankar were the music composers of the songs. Amber Gurung scored the background music. It premiered in 1973 in Kathmandu. Mann Ko Bandh was followed by Kumari (the first Eastman color Nepali film) in 1978, Sindoor in 1980, and Jeevan Rekha in a series. And "Badlindo Aakash" in 1984. Their success opened up the avenue for private parties to enter into filmmaking as an industrial endeavor.

Paral Ko Aago, directed by Pratap Subba, was produced by Cinema in 1978. The black-and-white movie proved to be a great success due to its story and melodious music. The actors were Tanka Sharma, Basundhara Bhusal, Susmita Dhakal, I.K. Singh, Menuka Pradhan, etc. The music director Shanti Thatal became the first female music director in Nepali movies. The lyrics were prepared by Manbahadur Mukhiya and Indra Thapaliya and the songs were sung by Aruna Lama, Dawa Gyalmo, Pema Lama, Shankar Gurung and Deepa Gahatraj (Jha). Pratap Subba was also the scriptwriter. It was based on a popular short story of the same name by Guru Prasad Mainali.

Golden era
With the start of the 1980s, some relatively more creative films were made and they became successful too. Thus, filmmaking started to appear as a more viable profession and the number of productions increased a bit. After the introduction of private companies in the Nepali film industry, the time came when more films were being made and they were much more accepted by Nepalese audiences. Badlindo Aakash, Samjhana, Kusume Rumal, Lahure, Kanchhi, Basudev, Saino and Koseli, which were released between 1984 and 1993, were very popular. The leading actors were Bhuwan K.C. and Tripti Nadakar, whose on-screen chemistry saw them being dubbed the "golden couple" of the industry. In the later years of the decade, the industry saw the rise of Rajesh Hamal and Karishma Manandhar.

In 1990, Nepal witnessed important political change. The people's movement brought the monarchy to its knees and democracy was restored. The society started to become open and vibrant. This had an important consequence for the fledgling film industry: It began to grow rapidly or even to "bloat". There was an unprecedented growth in the number of productions. Within three years, some 140 films were made. Distribution started to develop. Share in the existing market increased and the market itself expanded. Cinema halls increased to more than 300.

Conflict era
The start of the Maoist insurgency in Nepal in the mid-1990s was the beginning of the downfall of the domestic film industry. In the period of war and conflict, a very small number of films were made, and audience numbers fell sharply. It resulted in lower budgets and even lower performances, which resulted in even smaller audiences. In the later years of the conflict, the production and release of Nepali films had almost come to a standstill. Many actors and filmmakers left the country in search for work abroad. Actors like Saroj Khanal, Shiva Shrestha, Karishma Manandhar, Tripti Nadakar, Kristi Mainali and Gauri Malla had little work.

During the 1990s, some filmmakers, mostly with non-fiction base, started championing a new kind of cinema. They denounced the crude imitation of Bollywood aesthetics and demanded indigenous aesthetics and a more realistic approach. They made some films which have received some critical acclaim at home and some international recognition. Historic movies like Balidaan and Seema Rekha made during this period were appreciated by critics and audience.90s was majorly ruled by Rajesh Hamal , Bhuwan K.C. and Shiva Shrestha.

In 2000–2001, the then-highest-grossing Nepali film Darpan Chaya and 'Jindagani' was made. 'Jindagani' was directed and produced by Ujwal Ghimire. 'Darpan Chaya' was directed by Tulsi Ghimire and starred Dilip Rayamajhi, Niruta Singh and Uttam Pradhan. The film was a historic success. Its original box office figure is disputed though if adjusted for inflation the film is believed to be the highest-grossing movie ever in Nepal. The film's music is popular till today and remains one of the greatest Nepalese classic film ever. Early 2000s also marked entry of one of the biggest superstars of Nepal, Shree Krishna Shrestha

2006 - Present
By 2006, as the situation in Nepal calmed down and with Maoists coming into mainstream politics, the Nepali film industry started to return to its previous state, and more films were being made and released. This period also marked the commencement of digital films in the industry. After the historic success of Darpan Chayya, the production of romantic and romantic comedy movies increased in a bigger way. Some of the successful post-2006 films include Kagbeni, Sano Sansar, Mero Euta Saathi Cha, First Love and Kohi Mero. The early 2000s saw the rise of Nikhil Upreti as one of the biggest names in Nepali cinema, Biraj Bhatt, Ramit Dhungana and actresses like Jharana Thapa, Rekha Thapa, Arunima Lamsal, Rejina Upreti etc. Though film industry saw a dull phase. Such phase was mainly accused for lack of creativity in Nepali movies with routine action film were no able to excite audience.

But after the release of heist comedy Loot, Nepali movie industry changed completely and is credited for bringing audience back to theatres. Other successful films such like Loot were Andaaj,  Chapali Height, Nai Nabhannu La series, Kohinoor, Kabaddi, Kabaddi Kabaddi,(2015 film)  " Wada No 6".  " Chhakka Panja " series were the highest-grossing movies till date and Kalo Pothi became critically acclaimed in the domestic market as well as among the international diaspora .

The highest grossing Nepali film is Chhakka Panja (2016), grossing about NRs 22 crore followed by its sequel Chhakka Panja 2 , grossing Nrs 15 crore and Kohinoor (2014) with NRs 12 crore.

The US-Nepali documentary Manakamana, about pilgrims on the Manakamana Cable Car, was released in 2013 and received positive reviews.

In recent times many notable films are being made in Nepal.  In December 2016, Bijuli Machine, Nepal's first science-fiction film with a social story was released and ran successfully in cinemas. The movie was directed and written by Navin Awal with Santosh Lamichhane as a scientific consultant. It was reported that the movie set a trend in Nepali films by a making a movie with a low budget, without an item song, stereotypical fights or a romantic story, rather with an authentic Nepali story inspired by the problems faced in the society, like electricity power cuts, and still succeeded to entertain the audience.

Likewise, Kalo Pothi (Black Hen) by Min Bahadur Bham, Highway by Deepak Rauniyar, Nivna Lageko Diyo (Dying Candle) by Naresh K.C.  and Seto Surya (White Sun) by Deepak Rauniyar have been officially selected to major international film festivals  like Venice, Berlin, Toronto international film festival and winning award at Singapore international film festival.
The Legend of Shankhadhar is reported to be the first animated Nepali film.

Film Development Board 
The Film Development Board (FDB) is a liaison to facilitate the conceptualization, making, distribution and exhibition of Nepali films nationally. The Board attempts to bridge the gap between film entrepreneurship and government bureaucracy. The Board is a balance between the people at large, the government, and the process of filmmaking. It is intended to act as the safeguard of the interests of the people, the watchdog of the government, and the advocate of filmmakers.

Film production industries

 Maha Sanchar 
 Cine Makers Pvt. Ltd.
 Aama Saraswoti Geeta Devi Films- Produced Chhakka Panja

See also
 List of highest-grossing Nepali films
 List of Nepalese films
 National Film Awards (Nepal)
 Cinema of the world
 Tharu Cinema

References

External links
 Film Development Board of Nepal

 
Nepalese culture
Arts in Nepal